The women's mass start in the 2012–13 ISU Speed Skating World Cup was contested over four races on four occasions, out of a total of nine World Cup occasions for the season, with the first occasion taking place in Heerenveen, Netherlands, on 16–18 November 2012, and the final occasion also taking place in Heerenveen on 8–10 March 2013.

Kim Bo-reum of South Korea won the cup, while the defending champion, Mariska Huisman of the Netherlands, came second, and Ivanie Blondin of Canada came third.

Top three

Race medallists

Standings 
''Standings as of 10 March 2013 (end of the season).

References 

Women mass start
ISU